Manolescu is a Romanian surname that may refer to:

Ciprian Manolescu
Nicolae Manolescu
Ion Manolescu-Strunga
Mihail Manoilescu

See also 
 Manole (name)
 Manolescu (film)
 Manolescu's Memoirs

Romanian-language surnames
Patronymic surnames